Brandon T. Moore (born January 16, 1979) is a current head coach at the Colorado School of Mines and former American football linebacker. He was signed by the San Francisco 49ers as an undrafted free agent following the 2002 NFL Draft. He played college football at Oklahoma.

Moore has also been a member of the New England Patriots, Arizona Cardinals, Las Vegas Locomotives and San Diego Chargers.

Professional career

San Francisco 49ers
Moore was signed by the San Francisco 49ers as an undrafted free agent in the 2002 NFL Draft.  In 2006, Moore started 11 games and led the team in tackles (92) and sacks (6.5), playing inside and outside linebacker in the 49ers' 3-4 scheme.  Moore struggled the next year and was demoted to second string, coming in mostly as a situational pass rusher.  He was released on August 10, 2008.

Arizona Cardinals
On August 12, 2008, he was signed by the Arizona Cardinals. He was later released on August 30, 2008 during final cuts.

Las Vegas Locomotives
Moore was drafted by the Las Vegas Locomotives of the United Football League and signed with the team on August 5, 2009.  Moore was a starter for the Locomotives, and won UFL championship titles both seasons that he was a member of the franchise.

San Diego Chargers
On December 21, 2010, the San Diego Chargers signed Moore to a one-year deal.

Coaching career

Colorado Mines 
Moore was the Orediggers' defensive coordinator and linebackers coach leading up to his promotion on February 2, 2022, where he took on the role of head coach previously held by Gregg Brandon. In his first season, he led the Orediggers to an unbeaten season in Rocky Mountain Athletic Conference play and a run in the NCAA Division II playoffs that ended in a championship-game loss to Ferris State. After the season, he was named by the American Football Coaches Association as its Division II Coach of the Year.

Personal
Moore is the younger brother of former NFL wide receiver Rob Moore.

Head coaching record

References

External links
 Colorado Mines profile
 Just Sports Stats

1979 births
Living people
American football linebackers
Arizona Cardinals players
Colorado Mines Orediggers football coaches
Las Vegas Locomotives players
New England Patriots players
Oklahoma Sooners football players
San Diego Chargers players
San Francisco 49ers players
People from East Meadow, New York
Sportspeople from Nassau County, New York
Coaches of American football from New York (state)
Players of American football from New York (state)
African-American coaches of American football
African-American players of American football
20th-century African-American sportspeople
21st-century African-American sportspeople